Yanagawa Dam is an earthfill dam located in Chiba Prefecture in Japan. The dam is used for flood control. The catchment area of the dam is 11.4 km2. The dam impounds about 16  ha of land when full and can store 1720 thousand cubic meters of water. The construction of the dam was started on 1989 and completed in 1998.

References

Dams in Chiba Prefecture
1998 establishments in Japan